Al Hamriya is a locality in Dubai, United Arab Emirates (UAE). It is located in western Dubai, along Dubai Creek in Bur Dubai. Al Hamriya is largely a residential area; however several shopping complexes and foreign consulates are in its proximity. Dubai Creek is to the north; the locality of Al Souk Al Kabir and Umm Hurair are located to its west and east, respectively.

Important landmarks near or in Al Hamriya include BurJuman, Bank of Umm Al Quwain, Abu Dhabi Commercial Bank, Al Muassala Towers, and Four Points by Sheraton. Some of the consulates in the area include those of India, Britain, Oman,  Saudi Arabia and Kuwait.

References 

Communities in Dubai